Martina Lenzini (born 23 July 1998) is an Italian professional footballer who plays as a centre back for Serie A club Juventus FC and the Italy women's national team.

Honours
Juventus
 Serie A: 2021–22
 Coppa Italia: 
 Supercoppa Italiana: 2021–22

References

External links

 

1998 births
Living people
Sportspeople from the Province of Modena
Italian women's footballers
Women's association football midfielders
A.C.F. Brescia Calcio Femminile players
Juventus F.C. (women) players
U.S. Sassuolo Calcio (women) players
Serie A (women's football) players
Italy women's international footballers
Footballers from Emilia-Romagna
UEFA Women's Euro 2022 players
21st-century Italian women